California Beer and Beverage Distributors (CBBD) is the largest nonprofit trade association representing brewers, distributors, and retailers of beer in the state of California.

History
The CBBD was founded by Adolph Markstein, who also founded the National Beer Wholesalers Association.

Rockwell Project
The CBBD is a sponsor of the Rockwell Project, which is a program using the testimonial of Jim Rockwell to discourage persons below the legal drinking age from using alcohol.  Jim Rockwell is a man who, as a teenager, caused an automobile accident while driving under the influence of alcohol.

References

External links
California Beer and Beverage Distributors homepage
Rockwell Project

Trade associations based in the United States
Food industry trade groups